Everett George Faunce (June 12, 1926 – April 2, 2009) was an American football player and coach. Faunce played college football at Iowa State University in 1945 before transferring to the University of Minnesota for the remaining three years of his collegiate career. After a brief stint playing for the Baltimore Colts of the All-America Football Conference (AAFC), he served as the head football coach at Minot State University in 1950 at Utah State University from 1955 to 1958.

Head coaching record

References

External links
 

1926 births
2009 deaths
American football halfbacks
Baltimore Colts (1947–1950) players
Iowa State Cyclones football players
Minnesota Golden Gophers football players
Minot State Beavers football coaches
Utah State Aggies football coaches
People from Fergus Falls, Minnesota
Coaches of American football from Minnesota
Players of American football from Minnesota